Melanozestis is a genus of moth in the family Cosmopterigidae. It contains only one species, Melanozestis heterodesma, which is found in South Africa.

References

External links

Natural History Museum Lepidoptera genus database

Endemic moths of South Africa
Cosmopterigidae
Taxa named by Edward Meyrick
Moth genera